Tessuti is a chain of designer stores in the United Kingdom, retailing men’s and women’s designer collections, including clothing, shoes and accessories for men and women. Tessuti was founded in 1985 by David Light and 40% of the business was acquired by JD Sports PLC in May 2012, since becoming a key part of the JD Sports PLC strategy. In 2016, JD Sports PLC acquired Tessuti in full.

As of 2019, Tessuti has thirty-eight stores, including doors in Liverpool, Chester, Leeds, Merryhill, Meadowhall Sheffield and Ipswich.  The retailer also has two stores within Manchester's Trafford Centre and a Lowry Outlet store in Salford Quays. The multi-channel retailer also has stores inside Bluewater Shopping Centre, Metro Centre in Gateshead and Bradford Broadway. JD Sports PLC bought out menswear brand Cecil Gee in 2012, turning all five branches into Tessuti stores. Tessuti’s portfolio has also includes the Aspecto and Infinities retail businesses, bought by JD Sports PLC  in 2015 and that form part of an ongoing re-brand underneath the Tessuti umbrella. New store openings in 2018 included a new store at Manchester Arndale and Glasgow Fort.

History 

David Light, the founder of Tessuti, opened his first shop at 53 Watergate Row, Chester in April 1985. The first store to offer a number of international brands to Chester, Tessuti’s original store introduced new labels such as Stone Island, CP Company and Giorgio Armani to the city.

In late 2017, the brand suffered from undesirable publicity due to  animal rights campaigners drawing attention to the fact that stores sell products using real animal fur and goose down.

In April 2018, Tessuti launched a flagship store in Chester at 30 Bridge Street, a grade II listed building and former Liberty store.

Tessuti was the principal sponsor of the Sports & Leisurewear Award at Graduate Fashion Week in 2018 and 2019. The 2019 winner of the Tessuti Sports & Leisurewear award was Katherine Jayne-Watts for her sustainable sportswear collection.

Tessuti.co.uk 
The Tessuti website was launched in 2006 as an extension of the business offering the same brands available across the Tessuti stores.

Etymology 
The Tessuti name comes from the masculine plural of Tessuto, the Italian word for fabric.

References

External links 
 Official website

British companies established in 1985
Retail companies established in 1985
Clothing retailers of England
1985 establishments in England